Propebela cancellata is a species of sea snail, a marine gastropod mollusk in the family Mangeliidae.

Description
The shell has its axial ribs curved sigmoidally. The part between the suture and the ridge is devoid of spiral sculpture. The teeth of the radula are ensiform.

The shell contains nine whorls, somewhat convex, narrowly obtusely shoulders. The ribs are strong, flexuous, with a sigmoid curve at the shoulder. They are crossed by coarse spiral cinguli. The color of the shell is white, stained rosy or light chestnut, or yellowish.

Distribution
This species occurs in the Northwest Atlantic Ocean and the Gulf of Maine.

References

 Brunel, P., L. Bosse, and G. Lamarche. 1998. Catalogue of the marine invertebrates of the estuary and Gulf of St. Lawrence. Canadian Special Publication of Fisheries and Aquatic Sciences, 126. 405 p.

External links
  Mighels J.W. & Adams C.B. (1842). Descriptions of twenty-four new species of New England shells. Boston Journal of Natural History, 4: 37–54, pl. 4
 Trott, T.J. 2004. Cobscook Bay inventory: a historical checklist of marine invertebrates spanning 162 years. Northeastern Naturalist (Special Issue 2): 261–324
 

cancellata
Gastropods described in 1842